Q-L53 is a subclade of haplogroup Q-M346. Q-L53 is defined by the presence of the L53 Single Nucleotide Polymorphism (SNP).

Distribution 
Q-L53 has descendants across much of Eurasia and in the pre-Columbian Americas. It is the parent of the major Haplogroup Q-L54 branch.

Associated SNPs 
Q-L53 is currently defined by the L53 SNP as well as the L55, L213, L331, L475, and L476 SNPs.

Subgroups 
This is Thomas Krahn at the Genomic Research Center's Draft tree Proposed Tree for haplogroup Q-L53. It shows the first two branch points.

 Q-L53 L53, L55, L213, L331, L475, L476
 Q-L54 L54
 Q-M3 M3, L341.2
 Q-Z780 Z780
 Q-L456 L456
 Q-L568 L568, L569, L570, L571
 Q-L330 L330, L334
 Q-L804 L804, L805

See also
Human Y-chromosome DNA haplogroup

Y-DNA Q-M242 subclades

Y-DNA backbone tree

References

External links 
The Y-DNA Haplogroup Q Project

Q-L53